Leonard Urban Ransford (1880-1954), was a male badminton player from England.

Badminton career
Ransford born in Brixton  was a winner of the All England Open Badminton Championships. He won the mixed doubles in 1902.

References

English male badminton players
1880 births
1954 deaths